The 2007 United Kingdom Budget, officially known as Budget 2007: Building Britain's long-term future: Prosperity and fairness for families, was formally delivered by Gordon Brown in the House of Commons on 21 March 2007. It would turn out to be Brown's last Budget as Chancellor of the Exchequer, becoming Prime Minister on 27 June 2007.

The main changes were that basic rate of income tax would fall from 22% to 20% from April 2008 and that the lower starter rate of 10% would be removed. Vehicle Excise Duty on the highest-polluting vehicles would go up to £300 and to £400 from April 2008, with the least-polluting vehicles to have their duty reduced to £35. The savings limit for Individual savings account contributions would be increased to £7,200 from April 2008. The Inheritance Tax threshold would rise from £285,000 to £350,000 in 2010.

Planned resource budgets 2007–08

Details

Taxes

Spending

References

External links
 Complete Budget 2007 Report
 Speech delivered 21 March 2007

United Kingdom budgets
Budget
United Kingdom budget
Gordon Brown
March 2007 events in the United Kingdom